The 30th European Film Awards were presented on 9 December 2017 in Berlin, Germany. The nominations and winners are selected by more than 2,500 members of the European Film Academy.

Selection

 A Ciambra
 A Date for Mad Mary
 A Gentle Creature
 A Jew Must Die
 A Monster Calls
 Afterimage
 Ana, mon amour
 Big Big World
 BPM (Beats per Minute)
 Bright Sunshine In
 Brimstone
 Fortunata
 Frantz
 Frost
 Godless
 Happy End
 Heartstone
 Home
 Ice Mother
 In Times of Fading Light
 Indivisible
 Insyriated
 Istanbul Red
 Jupiter's Moon
 Lady Macbeth
 Layla M.
 Loveless
 My Grandmother Fanny Kaplan
 On Body and Soul
 Paradise
 Requiem for Mrs. J.
 Return to Montauk
 Sami Blood
 Son of Sofia
 Spoor
 Stefan Zweig: Farewell to Europe
 Summer 1993
 The Constitution
 The Fury of a Patient Man
 The Killing of a Sacred Deer
 The King's Choice
 The Last Family
 The Nothing Factory
 The Other Side of Hope
 The Party
 The Square
 The Teacher
 Tom of Finland
 Western
 Wild Mouse
 You Disappear

Awards voted by EFA Members

Best Film
The nominees were announced on 4 November 2017 in Seville, Spain at the Seville European Film Festival. Three films nominated for Best Film were premiered at the Cannes Film Festival, including the Palme d’Or winner The Square, and Grand Prix winner BPM (Beats per Minute). Four films (BPM (Beats per Minute), Loveless, On Body and Soul, The Square) had been submitted for Best Foreign Language Film at the 90th Academy Awards. Two films (Loveless, The Square) received nominations at the 19th British Independent Film Awards.

Best Comedy
The nominees were announced on 4 November 2017.

Best Director
The nominees were announced on 4 November 2017

Best Screenwriter
The nominees were announced on 4 November 2017

Best Actress
The nominees were announced on 4 November 2017

Best Actor
The nominees were announced on 4 November 2017.

Technical awards
A special seven-member jury convened in Berlin and decided on the winners in seven tech categories. The members of the jury are: 

Samir Fočo, sound designer, Bosnia & Herzegovina
Raf Keunen, composer, Belgium
Melanie Ann Oliver, editor, UK
Vassilia Rozana, costume designer, Greece
Susana Sanchez, hair & make-up artist, Spain
Łukasz Żal, cinematographer, Poland
Tonino Zera, production designer, Italy.

Best Composer
The winners were announced on 14 November 2017.

Best Cinematographer
The winner was announced on 14 November 2017.

Best Editor
The winner was announced on 14 November 2017.

Best Production Designer
The winner was announced on 14 November 2017.

Best Costume Designer
The winners were announced on 14 November 2017.

Best Sound Designer
The winner was announced on 14 November 2017.

Best Makeup and Hairstyling
The winner was announced on 14 November 2017.

Critics Award

European Discovery
The nominees were announced on 19 October 2017. Award given by International Federation of Film Critics - Prix FIPRESCI.

Best Animated Feature Film
The nominees were announced on 24 October 2017. One film (Zombillenium) nominated for Best Animated Feature Film were premiered at the Cannes Film Festival.

Audience awards

People's Choice Award
The nominees were announced on 1 September 2017.

University Award
The announcement of the five European University Film Award nominations took place during Filmfest Hamburg on 10 October 2017. Films were selected by: Fabian Gasmia (producer / Germany), Juho Kuosmanen (director / Finland), Elli Mastorou (journalist / Belgium/Greece) and Dagmar Brunow (Linnaeus University / Sweden). Five nominated films were screened and discussed in the respective classes and each university voted its favorite film.

Best Documentary

Best Short Film

European Co-Production Award — Prix Eurimages

Honorary Awards

European Achievement in World Cinema

Lifetime Achievement Award

References

External links 
 

2017 film awards
European Film Awards ceremonies
Culture in Berlin
2017 in Berlin
2016 in Europe
2017 in German cinema